The Chittagong Chamber of Commerce & Industry (CCCI), established in 1906, is an industry-led and industry-managed organization which represents the business and corporate sector in Chittagong, Bangladesh. The organization acts as a major advocate promoting the strategic economic development of Chittagong as the nation's business capital and a regional economic hub. Mahbubul Alam is the president of the organization since 2013. In 2016 the chamber called for increasing the tax exemption income level for women.

It is based in the Agrabad district.

See also
 FBCCI

References

Chambers of commerce in Bangladesh
Economy of Chittagong
Agrabad